Hostetter may refer to:

Hostetter, Pennsylvania, a census-designated place
Hostetter (VTA), a light rail station
Jacob Hostetter (1754–1831), a member of the U.S. House of Representatives from Pennsylvania
David Hostetter (1819–1888), American businessman and banker
Theodore R. Hostetter (1870–1902), American heir, businessman, polo player and yachtsman